Musong Yun clan was one of the Korean clans. Their Bon-gwan was in Kyonghung County, North Hamgyong Province. According to the research in 2015, the number of Musong Yun clan was 14572. Their founder was  who was a descendant of Yun Gyeong. He fled from China to Gochang County, North Jeolla Province in order to avoid conflicts happened in Later Tang.

See also 
 Korean clan names of foreign origin

References

External links 
 

 
Korean clan names of Chinese origin